Filipe Soares may refer to:
 Filipe Soares (footballer, born 1994)
 Filipe Soares (footballer, born 1999)
 Filipe Soares (footballer, born 2000)